The  is an AC/DC dual-voltage electric multiple unit (EMU) type operated by East Japan Railway Company (JR East) in Japan since March 1989.

The majority of the fleet was subsequently modified to become the 651-1000 series, and re-employed on Akagi and Kusatsu limited express services from March 2014.

Variants
 651-0 series: Original (nine 7-car and nine 4-car) AC/DC sets built from 1989
 651-1000 series: 7-car and 4-car DC-only sets modified from 651-0 series between 2013 and 2014
 Izu Craile: Rebuilt 4-car resort trainset entering service in July 2016

Operations
, a four-car 651-0 series set operates as a local service on a segment of Jōban Line between Iwaki and Tomioka, making 2 round trips a day. The 651-1000 series sets are used on Akagi, Swallow Akagi, and Kusatsu limited express services.

Formations

651-0 series

, the fleet of original 651-0 series trainsets consists of three (out of the original nine) seven-car sets (K102, 103, 105) and five (out of the original nine) four-car sets (K201, 202, 204, 205, 207), based at Katsuta Depot.

7-car sets
The seven-car sets, K101 to K109, are formed as follows, with four motored ("M") cars and three non-powered trailer ("T") cars, and car 1 at the Ueno (southern) end.

 Cars 2 and 5 are each fitted with one PS26 lozenge-type pantograph.
 Cars 1, 3, 4, and 6 have toilets.

4-car sets
The four-car sets, K201 to K209, are formed as follows, with two motored ("M") cars and two non-powered trailer ("T") cars, and car 8 at the Ueno (southern) end.

 Car 9 is fitted with one PS26 lozenge-type pantograph.
 Cars 8 and 10 have toilets.

651-1000 series

, the fleet consists of six seven-car sets (numbered OM201 to OM206) and three four-car sets (numbered OM301 to OM303), all based at Omiya Depot.

7-car sets
The seven-car sets, OM201 to OM206, are formed as follows, with four motored ("M") cars and three non-powered trailer ("T") cars, and car 1 at the Ueno (southern) end.

 Cars 2 and 5 are each fitted with one PS33D single-arm pantograph.
 Cars 1, 3, 4, and 6 have toilets.

4-car sets
The four-car sets, OM301 to OM303, are formed as follows, with two motored ("M") cars and two non-powered trailer ("T") cars, and car 8 at the Ueno (southern) end.

 Car 9 is fitted with one PS33D single-arm pantograph.
 Cars 8 and 10 have toilets.

Izu Craile 4-car set IR01

The converted four-car set IR01 (formerly OM301) is formed as follows, with two motored ("M") cars and two non-powered trailer ("T") cars, and car 1 at the southern end.

Car 2 is fitted with one PS33D single-arm pantograph.

Interior

History
The 651 series trains were introduced on new Super Hitachi limited services between Ueno and Sendai on 11 March 1989, and the trains received the 33rd Blue Ribbon Award presented annually in Japan since 1958 by the Japan Railfan Club.

From 2 December 2000, the Green car (car 4) was made entirely non-smoking, and the internal partitions were removed between December 2000 and January 2001. Three seats were added to the Green car in June 2004, increasing the seating capacity to 36. All cars became no-smoking from the start of the revised timetable on 18 March 2007. The refreshment vending machines were discontinued from 31 March 2008.

From the start of the revised timetable on 17 March 2012, six pairs of 651 series trains were removed from service and put into storage, replaced by new 10-car E657 series EMUs on Super Hitachi services. The entire fleet was replaced by the start of the revised timetable on 16 March 2013, but the sets were however retained for seasonal and additional workings.

From 1 October 2013, one 11-car 651 series formation was brought back into service for use on two Fresh Hitachi services daily while the E657 series fleet undergoes modification work to add LED seat reservation status indicators above each seat. This continued until March 2015.

651-1000 series conversions
Between late 2013 and early 2014, a number of 651 series sets were modified and renumbered 651-1000 series for use on Akagi and Kusatsu limited express services from the start of the revised timetable on 15 March 2014, replacing ageing 185 series EMUs. The modifications included disconnecting (but not removing) the original AC electrical equipment, replacing the original PS26 lozenge-type pantographs with the same PS33D single-arm pantographs used on E233 series suburban EMUs, and adding an orange bodyside stripe below the windows. No changes were made to the interiors.

Izu Craile resort train
The name is a portmanteau formed from "Cresciuto" (Italian for "mature"), "train", and the suffix "-ile". Car 1 has window-facing counter seats on the seaward side, car 2 has a bar counter and lounge, car 3 has semi-open compartments, and car 4 has conventional unidirectional 2+2-abreast seating. based at Kōzu Depot. On 30 January 2020, with the introduction of the E261 series on Saphir Odoriko services, JR East announced that the Izu Craile service would no longer be necessary, and that it would be retired. The train had its last run on 28 June 2020. JR East is still considering whether to scrap the singular trainset used.

Fleet details

The delivery, refurbishment, and conversion dates for the fleet are as shown below. All sets were originally built by Kawasaki Heavy Industries in Hyogo.

7-car sets

4-car sets

References

External links

 651 series Akagi/Kusatsu 

Electric multiple units of Japan
East Japan Railway Company
20 kV AC multiple units
Train-related introductions in 1989
Kawasaki multiple units
1500 V DC multiple units of Japan